Pretty Mess may refer to:

 "Pretty Mess" (Vanity song), a 1984 song by Vanity
Pretty Mess, a 2004 album by Bella
 Pretty Mess (album), a 2009 album by Erika Jayne
 "Pretty Mess" (Erika Jayne song), a 2010 single by Erika Jayne, title track of the album
 Pretty Mess (book), a 2018 book by Erika Jayne

See also 

 A Pretty Mess by This One Band, a 1996 extended play by Grandaddy
Erika Jayne Presents: The Pretty Mess Tour, a 2018 tour by Erika Jayne